Notgården is the place where the mountain Ormberget is located. Notgården lies in the city called Ludvika, and has about 300-450 permanent residents.

Dalarna

sv:Notgården